

National

Government

Military

Miscellaneous

Historic

See also
 Armorial of Singapore
 Majulah Singapura

References

Singapore
Flags